Colonial elections were held in South Australia on 21 February 1851. Only 16 of the 24 seats in the unicameral Legislative Council were popularly elected but was the first occurrence of voting franchise in the colony. The 1855 election was the second and last of this type. The 1857 election was the first contest which popularly elected all members to the new bicameral Parliament of South Australia.

The first six Governors of South Australia oversaw governance from proclamation in 1836 until self-government in 1857.

See also
Members of the South Australian Legislative Council, 1851–1855
Members of the South Australian Legislative Council, 1843–1851
Members of the South Australian Legislative Council, 1836–1843

References
Statistical Record of the Legislature 1836-2007: SA Parliament

Elections in South Australia
1851 elections in Australia
1850s in South Australia
February 1851 events